Burhan Muhammad (3 August 1957 – 19 May 2015) was an Indonesian diplomat. From 14 November 2012 until his death, he was the Ambassador to Pakistan. He was born in Yogyakarta.

Muhammad was badly burned and injured in a helicopter crash in Naltar, Gilgit-Baltistan, Pakistan on 8 May 2015. He later died at a hospital in Singapore, aged 57.

References

1957 births
2015 deaths
Ambassadors of Indonesia to Pakistan
Indonesian diplomats
Indonesian politicians
People from Yogyakarta
Victims of aviation accidents or incidents in Pakistan
Victims of aviation accidents or incidents in 2015
Victims of helicopter accidents or incidents